Virgil Tracy is a fictional character from Gerry Anderson's Supermarionation television show Thunderbirds, the subsequent films Thunderbirds Are GO and Thunderbird 6 as well as the TV remake Thunderbirds Are Go!. The character also appeared in the live action movie Thunderbirds. Virgil's specialist expertise is in demolition, heavy lifting and logistics.

Depiction

Original series
Second son of Jeff Tracy (instigator and financier behind International Rescue), Virgil was named after astronaut Virgil Grissom. Sources vary in the canon of the Thunderbirds series as to the character's age and birth date. In the factfile for the DVD compilation, Virgil's birthday is stated as 15 August 2002 or 2041, making him 24 years old. After studying at Denver School of Advanced Technology, he took up his role in International Rescue as principal pilot of Thunderbird 2. Besides piloting the delivery carrier of the rescue equipment he is usually called upon to operate the equipment and effect a rescue on site. Virgil occasionally pilots other Thunderbird craft, for instance in "Ricochet", Virgil is seen piloting Thunderbird 3 on return from Thunderbird 5 after helping sort out a communications blackout that put International Rescue out of operation for a couple of hours.

Virgil is as dedicated to his calling as any of his brothers. For instance, in "Terror in New York City", when Virgil is seriously injured when Thunderbird 2 is mistakenly attacked by a US warship, his first thoughts upon reawakening are his alarm at the fact that his craft is out of service for repairs when it could be needed at any time. Furthermore, he later has to be ordered back to bed by his father when such an emergency occurs. His off-duty demeanour is much less boisterous than his other brothers, indulging in painting and playing the piano.

Along with Jeff and Scott, Virgil is the only other Tracy to appear in all 32 episodes of Thunderbirds. However, he does not play a role in every rescue operation. He was also the first character to use the International Rescue radio code "F-A-B" in the first episode.

Virgil was voiced by American actor David Holliday for the 26 episodes of series 1 (1965). When Holliday was no longer available, British-Canadian actor Jeremy Wilkin provided the voice for the six episodes of series 2 (1966) and the two feature films.

Live-action film 
Dominic Colenso portrayed Virgil in the 2004 live action film, which focuses on Alan Tracy; as such, not much is known about this version of Virgil. According to Alex Pang's Thunderbirds: X-Ray Cross Sections, he is 20 years of age. He is described as a fitness fanatic, taking part in triathalons and other sporting events when off duty.

Remake series 
David Menkin portrayed Virgil in the 2015 TV series. He is the largest and strongest of the Tracy brothers, and is skilled in engineering and mechanics. His character is calm and level-headed, and he is also the peacemaker in the family.

Reception and influence
Writing about the original Thunderbirds for Broadcast magazine, Ross Bentley praises the character: "Virgil was my complete favourite. He remains, in my book, the ultimate role model for any aspiring renaissance man [...] He not only painted but he was also an accomplished pianist. Forget Bobby Crush or Mrs Mills (my only points of TV pianistic reference as a child), Virgil was the business."

Former England cricket captain Michael Vaughan is nicknamed "Virgil" for his likeness to the character.

References

External links
 www.fab1.co.nz - Thunderbirds Characters

American male characters in television
Fictional aviators
Fictional painters
Fictional pianists
Gus Grissom
Male characters in animated series
Male characters in film
Television characters introduced in 1965
Thunderbirds (TV series) characters
Fictional people from the 21st-century